The Carlyle Cup was a trophy contested annually by the Duke Blue Devils and the North Carolina Tar Heels.  It was awarded to the school that had the most combined head-to-head wins against the other school in all of the shared varsity sports for that academic year.  At the start of the 2010-11 season, the rivalry series was renamed the Battle of the Blues presented by Continental Tire.

Since the 2010-11 season, there has not been a recipient of the trophy.

Results

See also
 Carolina–Duke rivalry
 Victory Bell (Duke–North Carolina), the trophy awarded to the football winner

 

Duke Blue Devils 
North Carolina Tar Heels
University of North Carolina at Chapel Hill rivalries
College sports in North Carolina